The Bayer designation Tau Hydrae (τ Hya, τ Hydrae) is shared by two star systems in the equatorial constellation of Hydra. The two stars are separated by 1.74° in the sky.

 τ1 Hydrae, triple star system
 τ2 Hydrae, astrometric binary

The stars τ1 Hya and τ2 Hya, along with ι Hya and the 5th‑magnitude 33 Hya (A Hydrae), were Ptolemy's Καμπή (Kampē); but Kazwini knew them as ʽUḳdah, the Knot. According to the catalogue of stars in the Technical Memorandum 33-507 - A Reduced Star Catalog Containing 537 Named Stars, Uḳdah were the title for four stars: τ1 Hya as Uḳdah I, τ2 Hya as Uḳdah II, 33 Hya as Uḳdah III and ι Hya as Uḳdah IV 

References

External links
Olympic Doubles
The Belt of Venus amateur observation page
Tau Hydrae Elite Dangerous - trade database

Hydrae, Tau
Hydra (constellation)
Uḳdah